Bennison Island is an uninhabited granite island in Corner Inlet near the northern coast of Wilsons Promontory, in Victoria, Australia.

Access is by boat at high tide.

The island is part of Wilsons Promontory National Park  and the surrounding waters are within Corner Inlet Marine National Park and Corner Inlet Marine and Coastal Park.

External links 
 DEPARTMENT OF PRIMARY INDUSTRIES - Victorian Resources Online

References

Islands of Victoria (Australia)
Wilsons Promontory
Uninhabited islands of Australia